Whelm is the debut studio album by English singer Douglas Dare. It was released in May 2014 under Erased Tapes Records.

Track list

References

2014 albums
Erased Tapes Records albums